Tudehope is a surname. Notable people with the surname include:

 Damien Tudehope (born 1953), Australian politician
 David Tudehope, Australian physician